Transcend Information, Inc. is a Taiwanese company headquartered in Taipei, Taiwan that manufactures and distributes memory products. Transcend deals in over 2,000 products including memory modules, flash memory cards, USB flash drives, portable hard drives, multimedia products, solid-state drives, dashcams, body cameras, personal cloud storage, card readers and accessories.

It has offices in the United States, Germany, the Netherlands, United Kingdom, Japan, Hong Kong, China and South Korea. It was the first Taiwanese memory module manufacturer to receive ISO 9001 certification.

History
Transcend Information. Inc. was founded in 1988 by Mr. Chung-Won Shu, Peter, with its headquarters in Taipei, Taiwan. Today, Transcend has become a global brand of digital storage, multimedia and industrial products with 13 offices worldwide. The design, development, and manufacture all their products is done in-house, as well  as the marketing and sales.

Product lines
Transcend manufactures memory modules, flash memory cards, USB flash drives, card readers, external hard drives, solid state drives and industrial-grade products.

Memory cards – SD / CF / micro SD
 USB flash drives – USB 3.0 / USB 2.0
 External hard drives – Rugged series / Classic series / 3.5" Desktop storage
 Solid-state drives – 2.5" SSDs / M.2 SSDs / mSATA SSDs / Portable SSDs
 Card readers – USB 3.0 / USB 2.0 / USB Type - C
 Dashcams 
 Body cameras
 Personal cloud storage
 Apple solutions - Lightning / USB 3.1 flash drives / SSD upgrade kit / Expansion cards for MacBook Air and MacBook Pro / Portable hard drive and portable SSD for Mac
 Multimedia products - Digital media players / DVD writers
 Memory modules - For Desktop / Notebook / Server
 Embedded solutions
 Flash: SSD / CF / SD / MMC / eMMC / SATA Module / PATA Module / USB Module
 DRAM: Industrial temperature / Workstation / Server / Standard / Low voltage / Low profile

JetFlash

JetFlash are a series of flash based USB drives designed and manufactured by Transcend. In addition to USB flash drives, Transcend has also created different JetFlash software to maximize the usage of the flash drives. Types include:
 Hi-Speed Series - Performance-focused flash drives
 V Series - Design-oriented flash drives
 T Series - USB flash drives designed for replacing floppy/CD/DVD media
 Security Series - USB flash drives designed for security

Transcend, working in collaboration with Bharti Enterprises, has donated 500 2GB JetFlash V33 USB flash drives through the Bharti Foundation in order to support the Satya Bharti School Program in India.

Transcend has worked with Trend Micro to launch USB flash drives with preloaded anti-virus software exclusively in India.

Transcend's Jetflash 160 won the flash drive test conducted by German magazine ComputerBild.

See also
 List of companies of Taiwan

References

External links
 

Companies based in Taipei
Companies listed on the Taiwan Stock Exchange
Computer memory companies
Computer peripheral companies
Computer storage companies
Electronics companies of Taiwan
Graphics hardware companies
Portable audio player manufacturers
Taiwanese brands
Taiwanese companies established in 1988
2001 initial public offerings